Search for the Titanic is a graphic adventure developed by Codesmiths and IntraCorp and published by its subsidiary Capstone Software in 1989. It was released for MS-DOS compatible operating systems, then ported to the Commodore 64. Versions for the Apple II and Amiga were planned, but never reached development (or just cancelled and not completed in the case of the announced Apple II port). Accolade, Inc. helped to distribute the game. Much of the gameplay is based on Robert Ballard's expedition.

Gameplay
The game does oceanographic simulation. The player has to build up reputation and resources by exploring sunken ships on an expedition to find the Titanic. To gain funds, the player needs sponsorship with good reasons to carry out the voyage. If that works out, the player needs the right equipment, adequate supplies, an ideal vessel and competent personnel on a limited budget. Next the player navigates through the sea and finds a suitable place to dive and find a shipwreck. The game includes 75 shipwrecks, over 100 maps and charts and 47 ports to stop at. Problems can occur during the expedition including the crew's health declining, bad weather and running out of supplies and funds. Some of those shipwrecks include Spanish treasure and Noah's Ark.

Development
President of Intracorp, Leigh Rothschild was fascinated by historical shipwrecks and earned a degree in history the University of Miami. Being president of the large electronic company, Rothschild had access to a lot of multimedia. He built up his inspiration from whatever literature and videos on diving and shipwrecks he could dig up. It wasn't until June 1987, that Rothschild actually came up with an idea on the Titanic. For this project he needed recent photos of the shipwreck and expertise from an oceanographer. He turned his attention to Woods Hole Oceanographic Institution, whom his brother Kenneth had worked with previously and were conveniently located near enough for him to contact on a daily basis. Woods Hole were keen on the idea of a video game based on their exploits and Intracorp got the required rights. At the request of Robert Ballard, Intracorp changed it so that no treasure collecting occurred in the gameplay, in order to set a good example for players and future oceanographers.

Coding the game required the help of Codesmiths programmers Jeff Jones and Sean Puckett. Before their assignment, they did have a keen interest in the Titanic ocean liner. The proposal took ten days to produce. By November 1988, a substantial amount of programming had been completed. Puckett drew the maps of the game by hand. The simulated weather was the hardest feature to implement. All organisation names in the game were created so as not to coincide with real-life companies. Jones and Puckett had difficulty accurately researching the diving equipment, so they had to make educated guesses. Ballard's photos were no good for digitizing in their current format, so Codesmiths had the slides converted to contact prints (placed on one sheet of light-sensitive paper) at a photographic lab. Then the page of contact prints were placed inside a scanner with a special digitizing program to input them into a computer. The digitized images were then resized with dithering applied.

Release
An Amiga version of "Search for the Titanic" was introduced at the Winter CES in January 1989. The IBM PC compatible version was highlighted at the ACE Game of Show in 1989. 
 The Commodore 64 version was shown at the European Computer Trade Show in April 1990.

Reception

A reviewer from The Games Machine gave the game a score of 68% saying that the game lacks gameplay  and gets boring, but may be worth checking out if you are looking for something different. A reviewer from Zzap!64 gave the game a score of 50% finding the graphics and screens uninteresting and the gameplay boring. An ST Log reviewer described the game as an off-beat adventure with enough detail to consume a computer-bound treasure hunter
for hours.

Woods Hole Oceanographic Institution reviewed the game for its geographical accuracy.

References

External links

1989 video games
Adventure games
Commodore 64 games
DOS games
Cancelled Amiga games
Cancelled Apple II games
RMS Titanic in video games
Video games developed in the United States
IntraCorp games
Single-player video games